There are two total lunar eclipses occurring in 2015: 

 April 2015 lunar eclipse
 September 2015 lunar eclipse